Noor Husin (Dari: نور حسین; born 3 March 1997) is an Afghan footballer who plays as a midfielder for Southend United.

Early and personal life
Husin was born in Mazar-i-Sharif. His family moved to England when he was aged 5, to escape war. His father came to England first as a refugee, followed by the rest of the family, who settled in Croydon.

Club career

Reading
He began playing football at Reading's academy.

In mid October 2015, Husin joined Hemel Hempstead Town, He made his competitive debut for Hemel Hempstead on 17 October 2015 in a 2–2 away draw with Dartford. He scored his first competitive goal in that game as well, scoring in the 41st minute. He returned to Reading in early January 2016.
At the end of the 2015–16 season, Reading announced that Husin would leave the club.

Crystal Palace
Following his release from Reading, Husin joined Crystal Palace in the summer of 2016.

On 31 January 2017, Husin joined League Two side Accrington Stanley on loan for the remainder of the season, scoring on his debut against Notts County on 4 February 2017.

Notts County
On 12 January 2018, Husin joined League Two side Notts County from Crystal Palace on an 18-month contract. He made his competitive debut for the club on 20 January 2018 in a 2–1 away defeat to Exeter City. In doing so he became the first Afghan to play in the English Football League.

On 3 February 2018, Husin scored his first goal for Notts County in a 4–1 win vs Crewe Alexandra. He was released by Notts County at the end of the 2018–19 season.

Stevenage
On 1 August 2019, Husin joined League Two side Stevenage on a free transfer.

Dartford
On 22 February 2020, Husin joined Dartford.

Southend United
On 21 January 2022, Husin joined National League side Southend United.

Husin scored his first goal for Southend United on his third appearance in a 1–0 away win over Dover Athletic.

International career
Husin made his senior International debut for Afghanistan in December 2018. He played his first FIFA-approved game for Afghanistan on 20 March 2019 in a friendly against Oman.

Career statistics

Club

International

Honours
Dartford
Kent Senior Cup: 2019–20

References

External links

1997 births
Living people
Sportspeople from Mazar-i-Sharif
Afghan footballers
Afghanistan international footballers
English footballers
English Football League players
Reading F.C. players
Hemel Hempstead Town F.C. players
Crystal Palace F.C. players
Accrington Stanley F.C. players
Notts County F.C. players
Stevenage F.C. players
Dartford F.C. players
Southend United F.C. players
Afghan emigrants to England
Association football midfielders
Afghan expatriate footballers
National League (English football) players
People from Croydon
British Asian footballers